Popów may refer to the following places:
Popów, Łowicz County in Łódź Voivodeship (central Poland)
Popów, Poddębice County in Łódź Voivodeship (central Poland)
Popów, Lublin Voivodeship (east Poland)
Popów, Greater Poland Voivodeship (west-central Poland)
Popów, Silesian Voivodeship (south Poland)